Farida Ahmed Siddiqui (c.1937, Meerut - August 2013, Karachi) was a Pakistani religious scholar and Member of the National Assembly of Pakistan.

Background 
Siddiqui was born in Meerut, India. She received a post-graduate degree from the University of Karachi in 1958. She was the younger sister of Shah Ahmad Noorani.

Career 
Siddiqui was the Founder President of the Women Islamic Mission, and a member of the Anjuman-e-Tableegh-e-Islam and Islamic Mission Welfare. She was the author of several religious books. She was a former member of the National Assembly of Pakistan and she was also the only serving woman in the Council of Islamic Ideology before her death.

Death 
She died in Karachi at a private hospital after a long illness at the age of 76 in August 2013. She left behind two sons and a daughter.

References 

Pakistani women academics
Pakistani religious writers
20th-century Pakistani women politicians
2013 deaths
1937 births
Women members of the National Assembly of Pakistan
Politicians from Meerut
University of Karachi alumni